Christian Falster (January 1, 1690 – October 24, 1752) was a Danish poet and philologist, born at Branderslev (island of Laaland).   He became rector of the school at Ribe.  He preferred to live there, refusing to accept better positions, and keeping his rectorship.  He published translations of Ovid (1719) and the Satires of Juvenal (1731); 11 original satires on his times, often reprinted (1720–39); and in Latin a number of works, such as Viglia Prima Noctium Ripensiun (1721); Memori Obscur (1722); Amnitates Philologic (three volumes, 1821–32).

The editors of The Classical Journal wrote that:
Falster thought that all learning should be brought to bear upon theology,
and, like Erasmus, he  that classical authors could contribute
much toward sound religion.  Falster's work covered a broad field from the
history of Greek literature on the one hand, to Latin lexicography on the
other, recognizing that philology, in the narrow sense, and literature
are inextricably interwoven.

References

Danish male poets
18th-century Danish philologists
18th-century Danish translators
1690 births
1752 deaths
18th-century Danish poets
18th-century male writers
People from Lolland Municipality
People from Lolland